Raju may refer to:
 Raju, a Telugu caste of India

People
 Aalap Raju, playback singer
 Alluri Sita Rama Raju, Indian independence movement activist
 AVS Raju, Indian businessman
 Byrraju Ramalinga Raju, the founder-chairman of Satyam Computer Services Ltd 
 Captain Raju (1950–2018), Malayalam film actor 
 Dil Raju, Telugu film producer
 Gopal Raju, Indian-American editor and journalist
 Kolanka Venkata Raju, Mridangam artist
 Krishnam Raju, Legendary Indian film actor and politician.
 M. S. Raju, Telugu film producer
 M. Venkataraju, Indian film music director
 Maniyanpilla Raju, Malayalam film actor and producer
 Manohar Raju, Public Defender of San Francisco
 Manthena Venkata Raju, Indian politician and social worker
 Pallam Raju, Indian politician
 Pusapati Vijayarama Gajapati Raju, Maharaja of Vizianagaram and Indian Parliamentarian.
 Pusapati Ashok Gajapati Raju, Cabinet minister, Member of Parliament
 Prabhas Raju Uppalapati, is an Indian film actor, referred to as Young Rebel star in Telugu cinema.
 Raju Ananthaswamy, Indian music director
 Raju Baruah, member of United Liberation Front of Assam
 Raju Bhatt (Baroda cricketer), Indian cricket player from Baroda cricket team
 Raju Gaikwad, Indian football player
 Raju Kher, Hindi film actor
 Raju Narisetti, Indian businessman
 Raju Rai, American badminton player
 Raju Sundaram, a Kollywood film actor, director and choreographer
 Raju Shetti, Indian politician
 Raju Shrestha alias Master Raju, Hindi film and television actor
 Raju Srivastav, Indian standup comedian
 Raju Tamang, Nepalese football player
 Ram Gopal Varma, Indian film director, screenwriter and producer, known for his works in Bollywood and Telugu cinema.
 S. M. Raju, Indian civil servant
 Srini Raju, Indian businessman
 T. V. Raju, South Indian music director
 Venkatapathy Raju, a former Indian left arm spin bowler
 Yosri Derma Raju, Malaysian football player

Others
 MMA Raju, an Estonian mixed martial arts promotion
 Raju (film), a 2011 short film
 Raju, Iran, a village in Iran